Ivan Fedorovich Kodatsky (July 1, 1893 – October 30, 1937) was a Soviet politician.

Early years 
Born in to a working-class family in Nikolaev, Kodatsky graduated from a trade school, then worked as a turner at the Nikolaev shipbuilding company, where he participated in strikes and illegal workers' circles.

He traveled to Petrograd in 1914, where he worked at the Nobel & Lessner shipyard and joined the Bolshevik faction of the Russian Social Democratic Labour Party ("RSDLP(b)") and became an activist of the Vyborg Committee of the RSDLP(b).

Kodatsky was arrested in January 1917 and then released on March 6 (19), 1917 under an amnesty after the February Revolution. He was a member of the Vyborg District Committee and the Petrograd City Committee of the RSDLP(b) and was elected as a member of the Petrograd Council and Chairman of the Vyborg District Duma. He actively participated in the planning and execution of the October Revolution, in which he took the Petrograd city telephone exchange.

Career as a Communist official 
After the establishment of Soviet power he was appointed secretary of the People's Commissariat of Labor.

In April 1920 he became the head of communications of the Azov Sea. In September 1920 he was given responsibility for the organization of fisheries and the export of fish and other products on the shores of the Black and Azov Seas by the Council of Labor and Defense of the RSFSR. In 1921 he headed the fisheries department in Dagestan.

He was then sent to Petrograd, where he was secretary of the Vyborg Committee of the All-Union Communist Party(b) when it took action against the United Opposition.

In 1928 he was made deputy chairman, and, from April 1929, Chairman of the Leningrad Regional Council of the National Economy.

On January 10, 1930, Kodatsky was elected Chairman of the executive committee of the Leningrad Regional Council, and from December 13, 1931 to February 14, 1937, he was Chairman of the Leningrad City Council.

From 1925 to 1930 he was a candidate member and from 1930 to 1937 he was a member of the Central Committee of the VKP(b). He was also a member of the Presidium of the All-Russian Central Executive Committee and a member of the Central Executive Committee of the Soviet Union.

In January 1937 he was appointed head of the Main Directorate of Mechanical Engineering for Light Industry of the People's Commissariat of Heavy Industry of the USSR.

Purge, execution and rehabilitation 
In June 1937 he was arrested by the NKVD and was removed from the Central Committee. On October 29, 1937, the Military Collegium of the Supreme Court of the USSR sentenced him to capital punishment on charges of "participation in a counter-revolutionary terrorist organization". Kodatsky was shot on October 30, 1937, then buried at the Donskoy cemetery.

He was posthumously rehabilitated on March 14, 1956.

References 

1893 births
1937 deaths
Politicians from Mykolaiv
Burials at Donskoye Cemetery
Central Executive Committee of the Soviet Union members
Central Committee of the Communist Party of the Soviet Union members
Central Committee of the Communist Party of the Soviet Union candidate members
Soviet rehabilitations
Great Purge victims from Ukraine
Executed politicians
Members of the Communist Party of the Soviet Union executed by the Soviet Union
Old Bolsheviks